Gherang is a small rural township in Victoria, Australia. It is in the Surf Coast Shire local government area, and is located on the northern edge of the Great Otway National Park and the Anglesea Heath. At the 2006 census, Gherang had a population of 370. The area is mostly farmland, although there has been some rural residential subdivision. Quarries in the area produce good quality gravel which is mostly used for roads.

History
The area was settled by Europeans in the mid 19th century. The area was heavily forested and gravel suitable for roads was discovered. The Wensleydale railway line was completed in 1890 connecting the area to the Port Fairy railway line near Moriac with the intention of inducing development along the route, and transporting timber and firewood. A small station served Gherang but saw very little traffic.

However, in 1921 a rail siding about 700 metres south of the station was provided for the Gherang Gravel Conference, consisting of three municipalities in the Geelong area, which was quarrying a large gravel deposit adjacent to the line. Considerable quantities of gravel were railed out until the operation ceased in 1939. Just over a kilometre south of the station another rail siding was provided in 1926 for a privately owned gravel quarrying operation which functioned intermittently until 1941.

During World War II a small army base was established a few hundred metres east of the station, and materials and troops were brought in and out by train. After the war the line fell back into disuse and was permanently closed in 1948. The Gherang Military Post Office was open from 13 January 1942 until 22 September 1942, and from 15 February 1943 until 13 April 1943. Gherang has never had a civilian post office.

Wildlife
Marsupials that inhabit Gherang include kangaroos, echidnas, koalas and the brushtail possum. Pest species include rabbits, foxes and feral cats. The area supports bird populations the kookaburra, magpie, crow, willie wagtail, pigeon, quail and a variety of cockatoo species. Reptiles present include the brown snake, blue-tongued lizard and small skinks.

Geothermal Power
In 2007 Greenearth Energy announced a plan to build several geothermal power plants in the Gherang area to harness heat from granite 4 km below ground. Construction of a trial plant was planned to commence in 2010 but as of July 2011 work has not begun.

Australian Automotive Research Centre
On the south side of Gherang is the Australian Automotive Research Centre, the largest privately owned and independently operated automotive testing facility in Australia. Occupying a 1000 hectare site, it includes a 4.2 km highway circuit, vehicle handling tracks, brake test surfaces, and four wheel drive test tracks.

References

Towns in Victoria (Australia)
Surf Coast Shire